Hans-Peter Welz (born 8 January 1976) is an Austrian bobsledder. He competed in the four man event at the 2006 Winter Olympics.

References

External links
 

1976 births
Living people
Austrian male bobsledders
Olympic bobsledders of Austria
Bobsledders at the 2006 Winter Olympics
People from Kufstein
Sportspeople from Tyrol (state)